L'archipel is an office skyscraper in Nanterre, in La Défense, the business district of the Paris metropolitan area.

The building was completed in 2021, it has 24 floors at 106 m.

It will host the global headquarters of the company Vinci SA.

See also 
 La Défense
 List of tallest buildings and structures in the Paris region
 List of tallest buildings in France

References

External links 
 L'archipel

Archipel
La Défense
Office buildings completed in 2021
21st-century architecture in France